Giuseppe Palmas (6 January 1918 – 22 July 1977) was an Italian photo journalist famous for his pictures of celebrities taken in the 1950s–1960s.

He was born in Cesena, Italy and in 1946, he started working as a journalist for Corriere Lombardo in Milan and in 1953 moved to Rome. Later he returned to his native Cesena.

References

External links
Archivio Fotografico Giuseppe Palmas

1918 births
1977 deaths
Italian male journalists
Italian photographers
People from Cesena
20th-century Italian journalists
20th-century Italian male writers